Intelligence is a Vancouver-based crime drama television series created and written by Chris Haddock starring Ian Tracey and Klea Scott that aired on the CBC. With its pilot first airing on November 28, 2005, the series began regular broadcasting on October 10, 2006. CBC reaired the pilot on June 7, 2007 and began broadcasting reruns of season one on Fridays starting on June 8, 2007. A second season then aired from October 2007, concluding in December that same year. The series was produced by Haddock Entertainment, which also produced Da Vinci's Inquest and Da Vinci's City Hall.

Intelligence centres on Jimmy Reardon (Tracey), one of Vancouver's top organized crime bosses, and Mary Spalding (Scott), the director of the Vancouver Organized Crime Unit (OCU), who has offered Reardon immunity from prosecution in exchange for his role as a police informant. The show also stars Matt Frewer as Ted Altman, the scheming assistant director of the OCU who seeks to replace Spalding, and John Cassini as Ronnie Delmonico, Reardon's business partner and confidant.

The show's cast also includes Tom McBeath, John Mann, and David Green as CSIS directors; Eugene Lipinski and Andrew Airlie as colleagues of Spalding; and Bernie Coulson and Camille Sullivan as Reardon's brother and ex-wife.

The show was cancelled in 2008. The cancellation led to allegations that fear of the Harper government played a role in the decision.

Premise

Season one
Reardon and Spalding are parallel characters working together on opposite sides of the law. Both have followed in the footsteps of their respective families, and both face threats from others trying to derail their careers. Reardon represents the 3rd generation of his west coast crime family that began with his prohibition era bootlegging grandfather. Conversely, Spalding has her roots as the daughter of a former army intelligence officer. Spalding must constantly watch herself against the conniving Assistant Director Altman who is after her position, and the old school CSIS Regional Director Deakins, for whose job she is the leading candidate. For Reardon, it is the Disciples Motorcycle club, led by Dante Ribiso (Fulvio Cecere), whose aim is to control the whole of Vancouver's marijuana trade and ABM money laundering industry.

Season two
Season two begins with Jim Reardon trapped in a Seattle diner during a DEA setup.  Jim attempts to surrender to the Americans, only to end up causing a shoot out.  He flees the scene and goes into hiding.  DEA Agent Williams, re-arranges the evidence in the diner to make it appear as if Jim is a cop killer.  Meanwhile, Ronnie tries to orchestrate a rescue operation to get Jim safely back to Canada.
In Mary's world, the American mole Royden has been murdered in his hotel room and Mary scrambles to remain in control of the situation.  With Royden out of the way, Mary is appointed head of the Asia Pacific Region of CSIS.  Jim finally gets the bank deal set up and attempts to go legitimate but the constant violence of the Vancouver underworld and his affair with Lorna continually drag him further away from his ultimate goal of settling down and raising a family. The series ends with the newly arrived American competition starting a war which concludes with the shooting of Reardon in front of his club.

Cast and characters
 Jimmy Reardon (Ian Tracey):  Head of a third generation west coast crime syndicate, Jim Reardon is somewhat of an enigma.  He has an unrelenting work ethic and a keen sense for business, which he has used to grow the family business substantially.  His grandfather was a prohibition-era rumrunner and his father was into the heroin trafficking business.  Jim's business interests lie in "BC Bud," which is in high demand throughout North America.  Jim owns several legitimate businesses, including a trucking company, shipping company and lumber mill.  At heart, Jim is a family man and he is a very good father to Stella. His level-headed, calm and gentle yet ruthless personality make him an excellent leader.  Being an informer, Jim sometimes questions his own morality.
 Mary Spalding (Klea Scott):  The Head of CSIS's Asia Pacific Region, Mary, the daughter of a former military intelligence officer, is by all appearances egotistical, ambitious and self-serving.  She is also incredibly brilliant and driven.  Mary's zeal to rise up the ladder in life can cause her to overstep her authority.  In her personal life, she is less sure-footed.  A lonely woman, she dumped her cheating husband and is hesitant to become involved in a romantic relationship, Mary is always the outsider.  Despite this, Mary is fiercely charming and very witty, qualities which she uses to win over informants and superiors alike.
 Ted Altman (Matt Frewer):  Director of Vancouver's Organized Crime Unit (OCU), Ted Altman is a vicious, mean-spirited, borderline psychopath.  An alcoholic, Ted spends much of his day drinking.  The rest of the time he is looking for ways to take down Jim Reardon and Dante Ribiso.  Highly ambitious and equally ruthless, Ted will stop at nothing to get what he wants, even if it means breaking the law.  Outwardly, he appears charming, but underneath the facade, he is as ruthless as both Reardon and Dante.
 Ronnie Delmonico (John Cassini):  Owner of the Chick a Dee strip club and Jimmy's business partner, Ronnie is charming, intelligent, sophisticated, gregarious and pragmatic; however, he is also hot-headed and at times, indecisive.  Ronnie's father owned the Chick a Dee and with it, he made a name for himself.  Ronnie is operations manager of the Reardons' marijuana distribution ring.  Ronnie isn't entirely supportive of Jim's decision to inform to Mary, as he believes that Jim is breaking the code of honour among thieves.   A born womanizer, Ronnie has been married and divorced at least once; he is now with Sweet, the alpha stripper at the Chick a Dee, and the mother of his unborn child.
 Bob Tremblay (Darcy Laurie):  Jim Reardon's chief lieutenant and enforcer, Tremblay was trained as a boxer and special forces recon soldier.  He is a calm, calculated and cool guy.  Tremblay is surprisingly spiritual.
 Francine Reardon (Camille Sullivan):  Jim's ex-wife and the mother of his daughter, Stella, Francine is a force to be reckoned with.  An alcoholic and cocaine addict, Francine's demons have gotten the best of her time and again.  Recently she has been able to get somewhat clean, but she still has a long way to go.  She is intent on getting back together with Jim and will stop at nothing to accomplish her goal.  Intensely jealous, Francine savagely guards her status in Jim's life and in doing so, she has become a very dangerous loose cannon.
 Michael Reardon (Bernie Coulson):  Jimmy's younger brother, Mike has many qualities that are required to be a successful criminal.  However, the trait that he lacks is perhaps the most important:  intelligence.  Mike is a well-intentioned, yet completely incompetent heroin smuggler and addict, who recently spent time in prison for conspiracy to traffic narcotics.  Mike is fiercely loyal to Jimmy, but suspicious and critical of Ronnie.  Mike is unable to break from the cycle of addiction that he is trapped in.  He also has a hot-headed and violent personality, which makes him unsuitable for the family business.  Mike is very musically inclined and he is involved in Vancouver's music scene.  He aspires to make his own way in Vancouver's underworld, completely separate from his brother, but don't mistake his aspirations for disloyalty to Jim.  Mike would die for his brother.
 Stella Reardon (Sophie Hough):  The teenage daughter of Jimmy and Francine.  For most of her life, she had no idea that her father was involved in Vancouver's criminal underworld, let alone one of the most powerful criminals the city had ever seen.  Stella is witty, intelligent and mature for her age, and her intelligence allowed her to deduce what it was that her father really did for a living.
 Phil Coombs (Shane Meier):  Phil is the Reardon family lawyer.  Young, sophisticated, connected and extremely talented, Phil is one of Jim's most trusted advisors.  His goal, along with Jim's is to turn the Reardon family enterprises and Jimmy himself, legitimate within five years.  To accomplish this ambition, Phil and John Hogarty, have pushed Jim and Ronnie to purchase controlling shares of the First National Bank of Ireland, Bahamas Branch.  This allows them to wash hundreds of millions of dollars in dirty money per year and it provides money for future projects and business ventures.  Wise beyond his years, Phil is a constant source of valuable information due to his connections.
 Dante Ribiso (Fulvio Cecere):  Leader of the Disciples, an outlaw motorcycle gang.  Dante is very cool headed and calm, yet incredibly ruthless.  He is willing to use extreme violence and intimidation to get his way.  Dante is no stranger to killing.  His nephew was gunned down by the Vietnamese and he has been responsible for the murders of several of Reardon's allies.  Dante and Jim usually get along.  There is a lot of bad blood between the Vietnamese and the Disciples.
 Rene Desjardins (Michael Eklund):  A narcotics detective with the Vancouver Police Department, Rene is Jim's rat inside the police.  A quiet and nervous man, Rene is not exactly an upstanding citizen.  He would be more at home working for Jim's criminal enterprise than being a cop, but he is much more valuable as the inside man in the narc squad.  Rene usually has to be prodded to reveal the information that he knows.  Jim pays him for the information in cash and season tickets to hockey games.
 Phan (Tuan Phan):  Leader of the Vietnamese crew, Phan is no stranger to Jim and Ronnie.  They do business together and always help each other out when needed.  Often at war with the Disciples, and after the unfortunate death of his cousin, Johnny, both Phan and Jim finally make a truce deal with Dante and the Disciples.
 John Hogarty (David Lovgren):  John Hogarty is Jim's banker, and as such, he is in control of most of Jim's money and holdings.  To better control Hogarty, Jim cultivated in him a love of strippers and cocaine, which has quickly taken over his life.  Hogarty's coke addiction makes him an unpredictable and untrustworthy employee.  Jim will later come to regret introducing Hogarty to cocaine.
 Lorna Salazar (Leela Savasta):

Episodes

TV Movie

Season 1

Season 2

DVD releases

Acorn Media has released the entire series on DVD in Region 1.

Cancellation
On March 7, 2008, the CBC announced that Intelligence would be cancelled.

There were various rumors surrounding the cancellation of the series. Kevin Baker from the National Post alleged:

Chris Haddock, the show's creator, commented in an interview one year before the cancellation on how the show received no promotion by the CBC, and on how mention of its awards nominations were left out of a pre-awards show:

When the show was brought to Netflix in 2017, John Doyle commented in The Globe and Mail:

References

External links 

Intelligence at the CBC
Slate - The Canadian Wire - What, you haven't watched Intelligence?
CBC review of Intelligence
Intelligence Episode Guide: reviews and recaps
News and media releases related to Intelligence
msn Canada - Chris Haddock interview re Intelligence Dec 2006

2006 Canadian television series debuts
2007 Canadian television series endings
2000s Canadian crime drama television series
CBC Television original programming
Television series by Sony Pictures Television
Television shows set in Vancouver
Television shows filmed in Vancouver
Gemini and Canadian Screen Award for Best Drama Series winners